Thabo Senong is a South African football manager.

In August 2019, he was appointed as manager of the Lesotho national football team.

Prior to his appointment, Senong was coach of the South Africa national U-20 team, known as the Amajitas. He coached at the 2017 Africa U-20 Cup of Nations, 2017 FIFA U-20 World Cup, 2019 Africa U-20 Cup of Nations and 2019 FIFA U-20 World Cup.

He won the COSAFA U-20 Cup with the Amajitas in 2017.

References

1980 births
Lesotho national football team managers
People from Soweto
Living people
South African soccer managers